The Frozen North is a 1922 American short comedy film directed by and starring Buster Keaton. The film is a parody of early western films, especially those of William S. Hart. The film was written by Keaton and Edward F. Cline (credited as Eddie Cline). The film runs for around 17 minutes. Sybil Seely and Bonnie Hill co-star in the film.

Plot

The film opens near the "last stop", a subway terminal (apparently) in Alaska, which appears to be emerging from deep snow in the middle of nowhere. A tough-looking cowboy emerges. He arrives at a small settlement, finding people gambling in a saloon. He tries to rob them by scaring them with a cutout taken from a poster of a man holding a gun, which he places at the window, to appear as if he has an accomplice. He tells the gamblers to raise their hands in the air. Frightened, they hand over their cash, but soon they find out the truth when a drunk man looks closer over the cutout and tips it over. Keaton attempts to hand the cash that he has been collecting back, but is thrown out through the window.

Next, he mistakenly enters a house thinking that it is his own house. Inside, from behind, he sees a man and a woman kissing before a fire. Thinking the woman is his wife, he begins to cry and shoots the couple, moments later to realize his mistake, whereupon he makes his exit. He goes to his own house, where he finds his wife, who greets him, but he spurns her coldly, and she screams in anguish. She goes to a wall, and a vase drops on her head and knocks her unconscious; Keaton glances at her momentarily without interest, and then goes back to thinking again. While investigating the shooting of the couple, a passing policeman then knocks at Keaton's door after hearing his wife scream. Keaton saves himself from arrest by playing music on a gramophone and pretending to dance with his unconscious wife, acting as if all were normal. Seeing this, the officer turns and leaves again, and he drops her on the floor.

He looks out of the window and sees his pretty neighbor. He quickly dons an elegant white suit and picks flowers (mysteriously growing from the deep snow; a sign reads "Keep Off the Grass"). He attempts to woo her, but she doesn't appear to favor him. Her husband comes back inside to get something he forgot, and angrily takes his wife away with him after finding Keaton inside the house with her moments after he had left. Keaton bares his teeth threateningly at him as he leaves and they stare each other in the eye.

The neighbors leave on a sled for a new, even more bleak northerly location. Keaton gets a "car" (a cross between a dog sled and an early automobile, with an engine) driven by a friend to follow them, but it breaks down, so he has to hail a passing "taxi" (a horse drawn sled with upholstery). The taxi is stopped by a traffic warden (riding a classic Harley-Davidson motorcycle frame mounted on skis driven by a pusher propeller - an actual mode of transport, not a joke for the film), but they get away: Keaton is up to his old tricks—he flips the propeller around to reverse the thrust, so after they drive off in the middle of the traffic stop, the officer goes backward into a lake when he restarts his engine to chase them. Near the north pole (sign: North Pole, 3 miles south; perhaps it means North Pole, Alaska?), he and Roberts find a hotel-like igloo with wall-hangings of a stag's head and a guitar. In a gag Keaton tries to hang his hat on a stag head antler but it falls off. They attempt to survive by fishing in the manner of the Eskimos. Keaton makes snow-shoes from guitars and attempts to catch fish using tinned sardines as bait, but just creates trouble—he first falls through the ice and then tries to fish—but the only things he "catches" are another fisherman's strung fish and the other fisherman himself.

Forced to flee back to the igloo, where his companion is using a carpet sweeper on the ice floor, Keaton sees his pretty neighbor again in her new hut. Apparently fortified by drinking a bottle of cola, grimacing as if it were strong liquor, he decides he will go and make another attempt to win or coerce the other woman. He appears at her hut, and enters, to her distress. Upon hearing the husband returning to the hut to show his wife some gold he had just panned out of the water, Keaton resolutely bars the door with his arm, to prevent the husband from entering, only to discover the door hinges on the other side. After jumping and falling out the window, he disguises himself as a snowman to elude the husband when he runs out of the door in pursuit, and returns to the hut, where he is momentarily shown dressed as Erich von Stroheim's character from the film Foolish Wives, to indicate his villainous intent to force himself on her (or her apprehension of his intent). The husband reappears outside, searching for his wife, scanning the horizon; while he is searching for her, Roberts approaches him wearing clumsy cross-country skis, without being noticed, and stabs him in the arm. The husband appears to punch the friend so hard he flies through the air and lands headfirst in the ice fishing hole from earlier in the film. The husband returns to find his wife weeping on the floor as Keaton stands over her. He pulls out his own knife, and wrestles with Keaton. Keaton's wife appears outside the window, and shoots her husband in the back as they struggle. As husband and wife embrace, the wounded Keaton lying on the floor takes a derringer from his pocket and points it at the husband, but at that moment a janitor wakes Keaton up in the front row of a film theater (the gun in the last scene turns out to be a folded newspaper in his hand) and Keaton realizes that it was all a dream.

Production
The film followed Roscoe Arbuckle's arrest for the rape and manslaughter of actress Virginia Rappe. While studio executives ordered Arbuckle's industry friends and fellow actors (whose careers they controlled) not to publicly speak up for him, Keaton did make a public statement in support of Arbuckle's innocence. However, William S. Hart, who had never met or worked with Arbuckle, made a number of damaging public statements in which he presumed that Arbuckle was guilty. Arbuckle later wrote a premise for a film parodying Hart as a thief, bully and wife beater which Keaton purchased from him. Hart was widely believed in the industry to be "prone to domestic violence" and Keaton believed that Hart was helping to convict Arbuckle. Keaton produced, directed and starred in The Frozen North, the film that resulted.

Keaton wears a small version of Hart's campaign hat from the Spanish–American War and a six-shooter on each thigh, and during the scene in which he shoots the neighbor and her husband, he reacts with thick glycerin tears, a trademark of Hart's. Keaton spoofs Hart's demeanor, and comically attempts Hart's iconic one handed cigarette roll. Keaton spends a lot of time standing and staring to imply Hart's wooden acting, which is reinforced in the scene where he puts a picture of a cowboy in a doorway to dupe gamblers, and the image on the picture is Hart. Audiences of the 1920s recognized the parody and thought the film hysterically funny. However, Hart himself was not amused by Keaton's antics, particularly the crying scene, and did not speak to Keaton for two years after he had seen the film. The comedy also briefly parodies Erich von Stroheim's womanizing character from the film Foolish Wives. In contrast to Hart, von Stroheim was delighted with the parody of his character.

The film was photographed on location at Donner Lake outside Truckee, California, in mid-winter. The film's opening intertitles give it its mock-serious tone, and are taken from The Shooting of Dan McGrew by Robert W. Service.

Many of the gag sequences from The Frozen North, including the fishing sequence and wearing guitars as snowshoes while carrying a mattress, were later used by The Three Stooges in Rockin' thru the Rockies.

The gag of a protagonist being in a film in a dream sequence and waking up in the end is also in the film Sherlock Jr..

Cast
 Buster Keaton as The Bad Man
 Joe Roberts as The Driver
 Sybil Seely as Wife
 Bonnie Hill as The Pretty Neighbor
 Freeman Wood as Her Husband
 Edward F. Cline as The Janitor

See also
 Buster Keaton filmography

References

External links

 
 
 The Frozen North at the International Buster Keaton Society

1922 films
1922 comedy films
1922 short films
Silent American comedy films
American silent short films
American black-and-white films
Articles containing video clips
Films directed by Buster Keaton
Films directed by Edward F. Cline
First National Pictures films
Films produced by Joseph M. Schenck
Films shot in California
Films with screenplays by Buster Keaton
1920s American films